Petar Bojić (Serbian Cyrillic: Петар Бојић; born 4 September 1991) is a Serbian football midfielder who plays for Sepsi OSK.

Club career
Bojić played for youth categories of Sloga Požega, and also spent 2 years with youth team of Sloboda Užice. Later he returned in Sloga Požega where he started professional career, and made 15 appearances and scored 1 goal.

Mladost Lučani
For two seasons in this club, he played 53 matches and scored 7 goals. He was player of the match when he scored 2 goals in away match against Sloga Kraljevo on Kraljevo City Stadium. That was the first home loss for Sloga Kraljevo in almost 2 years.

Napredak Kruševac
After great season in Mladost Lučani, he moved to Napredak Kruševac. He continued to play in excellent form, and he is one of the best and most important player in team. He made his professional debut for Napredak Kruševac on 10 August 2013, in Jelen SuperLiga away match versus FK Jagodina. In December 2013, he moved to Čukarički.

Čukarički
After four years at FK Čukarički, Bojić left the club at the end of 2018.

Mladost Lučani
On 8 February 2019, Bojić joined FK Mladost Lučani on a contract for the rest of the season.

Vojvodina
On 1 July 2019, Bojić joined FK Vojvodina signing a 3 year contract.

Career statistics

Honours 

Napredak Kruševac
Prva Liga Srbije: 2012–13

Čukarički
Kup Srbije: 2014–15

Vojvodina
Kup Srbije: 2019–20

Sepsi OSK
Supercupa României: 2022

Notes

References

External links 
 
 Petar Bojić stats at utakmica.rs
 

1991 births
Living people
Sportspeople from Čačak
Association football midfielders
Serbian footballers
FK Mladost Lučani players
FK Napredak Kruševac players
FK Čukarički players
FK Vojvodina players
Sepsi OSK Sfântu Gheorghe players
FK Kolubara players
Serbian First League players
Serbian SuperLiga players
Liga I players
Serbian expatriate footballers
Serbian expatriate sportspeople in Romania
Expatriate footballers in Romania